is a 2D fighting game co-developed by Ecole Software and French-Bread. It received many updates for adjustments and characters.

Gameplay
The game has similar mechanics to Melty Blood, Guilty Gear and BlazBlue. It uses three attack buttons and a fourth one tied to the "GRD" meter. Attacks can cancel each other in any order, and into special and super moves. GRD is a tug-of-war mechanic to reward players for defense or offense, for them to use Shield, an enhanced defensive technique; Assault, an air dashing move; and Force Functions, a character-specific action serving as offense or a temporary buff. Whichever character has more GRD at the end of a cycle gains a temporary "Vorpal" buff, improving their moves and damage, and using Chain Shift, which cancels any move, resets the character to a neutral state and receives extra meter for the GRD. However, incorrectly guarding moves with Shield causes a state known as GRD Break, which locks a character out of any techniques with GRD. A traditional super meter known as the EXS Gauge fills up whenever players can attack or get hit. Characters spend half a meter for powered-up versions of special moves, or a full bar for Infinite Worth move, a high-damage super attack. When their health is below 30%, characters can use Infinite Worth EXS, an extremely strong super activated by pressing four buttons. A technique called Veil Off can be utilized if a character has more than half a bar of meter, giving a "burst" shockwave, sending the opponent and a powered up state for damage boost and temporary use of infinite super meter. For [st], the game adds new features, including Cross-Cast Veil Off, which characters with at least half a bar of super meter and Vorpal state can cancel combos into a Veil Off burst, and visual novel series Chronicle Mode.

Plot
Every month, a phenomenon called the Hollow Night brings forth invisible, immortal creatures called Voids. They feed upon a power known as EXS, which they gain by attacking humans caught within the Hollow Night. Though the attack results in death or Void transformation of victims, anyone who survives becomes an In-Birth, gaining the ability to control EXS. After surviving a Void attack, high school student Hyde Kido receives the power to summon Insulator, a magical sword killing In-Births. An immortal girl named Linne offers to train him with powers on the condition that when he is ready, he will end her life. Caught in a battle by others vying for control over EXS, Hyde finds a way to survive until the next night.

Characters 
The original release of the game included ten playable characters, with two more being added post-launch. The roster currently has a total of 21 fighters as of the release of Under Night In-Birth Exe:Late [cl-r], with two of these being guest characters from other fighting games. The game has Japanese-language voice acting. Some characters later appeared in BlazBlue: Cross Tag Battle, where they received English voice actors for the first time.
: The protagonist of the game. A high school student and one of the survivors of a Void attack. He wields the legendary dark-red magical sword Insulator.
: An ancient immortal princess of the Night Blade and the current leading organization of the Hollow Night. She was cursed into a Re-Birth alongside her twin brother and former wielder of Insulator, . They were reincarnated in their current host bodies. Her current one is a child who goes to elementary school, where she befriended a girl named .
: A hulking wise half-Void and Linne's guardian. He is a former member of the anti-Void organization Licht Kreis back in the day when he was a human, until his defection to Night Blade during a war between two organizations, after Kuon saved him from becoming a Void Fallen.
: A young delinquent man with a violent attitude who both Hyde and Seth refer to as a "crayfish", with Carmine referring to them as "clownfish". He uses a strange red substance in battle which he falsely believes to be his own blood, and thus suffers from placebo wherein he feels weakened should he use his powers for too long.
: A leader of her team within Licht Kreis whose parents were killed by an intelligent Void. Alongside a girl named Lex Bartholomew, she was sent undercover to Kanzakai under alias of a student  where she befriends Hyde.
: A mercenary, a bartender, and one of the co-founders of Amnesia, an organization seeking to dominate the Hollow Night. He quits his job, after a freak incident involving the death of a fellow founder, .
: An amnesiac intelligent flying Void accused of killing Orie's parents. He was once a human seeking to become a Re-Birth. Upon his incomplete transformation into a Void, he not only retains part of his form, but survives in daylight with the cost being that his body often makes him hunger for human flesh. Merkava does not use EXS, but a power known as False. Otherwise known as FLS.
: Unit code, 10,067. An ancient "Autonomic Nerve" designed as an anti-Void weapon. She is known to lack common sense among human society and will bewilder those around her for not wearing clothes. She used to have a seventh wing, but it transformed into the sword Insulator. Vatista also uses the power of FLS rather than EXS abilities.
: An assassin of the Night Blade. He met Linne when she was under the alias of a young woman, . Seth wields a pair of dark-blue magical daggers Eliminator received from a secret contractor and organization member.
: A not so smart female samurai hailed from the clan and serving the Night Blade. She founded the fighting style Dual Moon Blade Swordsmanship and plans to use the ability to bring peace. Yuzuriha also has a liking to rice crackers.
: The antagonist of the game, leader and one of the co-founders of Amnesia who seeks to become a Re-Birth. She fuses the power of darkness and light. Hilda is known to be an airhead sometimes, along with being a little insane.
: Real name . Amnesia's chief strategist, who can project and manifest the object he obtained. He accompanies , a monstrous lizard summoned from the Book of Chaos Code stolen from the Licht Kreis library shortly before joining Amnesia. He is Seth's contractor, and the one who found the daggers Eliminators from an unknown source.
: A middle school student who is attacked by a Void and turned into an In-Birth. Not understanding how one becomes an In-Birth, Nanase mistakenly believes Hyde to be responsible for her transformation.
: A middle school student accompanied by his "sister", . In truth, the real Tsukuyomi died in the accident where Byakuya lost his sanity due to his sister complex and became an In-Birth with the powers resembling that of a void. Byakuya eventually meets , a former member of a defunct Demon Society whom he thought her to be his sister's reincarnation, and currently acts as her replacement.
): Nanase's best friend with a chūnibyō personality. A former member of an In-Birth school club EFG, she received the EXS ability and left the club. Her real name is Yoshiko.
: A member of Licht Kreis and a member of Orie's team. She is often very reckless, stubborn and hyperactive to the point she is often punished by those above her by rank as if they are her parents. She is known to have temper tantrums as if she were a toddler. Despite her petite frame, she uses gauntlets almost bigger than her called, Pachelbell Cannon and her EXS abilities are called Diesel.
: A former martial artist and member of Amnesia who prefers to go by the name . He is bitten by a Void and being granted with a small amount of EXS, with the pair of large shackles on his wrist act as limiters to unleash his full EXS potential in unsealed state for a limited time. He seeks strong opponents to fight to the death.
: One of the members for Licht Kreis. She is Orie's one sided rival and was sent to school in Japan due to her reckless and albeit, questionable methods on the job, and is the one responsible for Roger's death. Wagner uses the power of fire.
: Wagner's self-proclaimed rival and a member of Ritter Schild, a male only branch organization of Licht Kreis from the result of Waldstein's defection to the Night Blade. He fights with the power of ice.

Guest Characters:
  from Melty Blood. She is referred to as  within the context of Under Night In-Birth. Eltnum is one of the main characters of Melty Blood who has little to no role in the main story. She is often making remarks on all the fighters as if they are novices, while often showing she is self aware of the fact she is a character from the Melty Blood series inside the current game she's in. Even going as far as to mention having appearances in arcades. Specifically, on the Sega Naomi hardware.
  from Akatsuki Blitzkampf. Akatsuki is the protagonist of Akatsuki Blitzkampf. He has little to no role to the main stor. Unlike Eltnun, Akatsuki is in no way self aware and only looking for a way to get back to his duties.

Development
The game began development in 2010. Nobuya Narita discussed how it arose from the team's experiences working on Melty Blood. French-Bread originally planned to work on the high-definition title for the game, but development later stalled while Type-Moon went on to work on Mahōtsukai no Yoru. Early prototypes provided the foundation for the game. Narita emphasized they wanted to differentiate the game from Melty Blood, so the lore, visuals, systems and combat flow are much different from the previous work. It marked the team's first game using high definition and features hand-drawn high-resolution sprites. In March 2013, Sega added support for its ALL.Net P-ras Multi service, a distribution network that allows multiple arcade owners to receive copies of the game without providing a dedicated arcade cabinet for each copy. Other games that utilize this service include Arc System Works' Guilty Gear XX Accent Core Plus R and Triangle Service's Game Center Love. A decade later in 2021, thanks to Sion's inclusion in Under Night, the inclusion of said French Bread's original game series in BlazBlue: Cross Tag Battle and Evo 2019’s main tournament event, the untitled Melty Blood HD remake was announced as a prequel reboot game title to 2021 remake of Tsukihime, Melty Blood: Type Lumina.

Release

Sega released the arcade version in Japan on September 20, 2012. A major revision, entitled , was released on September 9, 2013. Arc System Works released the game for PlayStation 3 on July 24, 2014. A 2015 release for North America and Europe was later announced. It was released in North American on March 31, 2015, according to GameStop. However, Aksys Games revealed the release date for Exe:Late, they said the game will be released on February 24, 2015. Exe:Late was released on Steam for Microsoft Windows systems on July 12, 2016.

A further update to the game entitled  was announced on May 15, 2015. Under Night In-Birth Exe:Late[st] was released on PlayStation 3, PlayStation 4 and PlayStation Vita in Japan on July 20, 2017, and in North America and Europe on February 9, 2018.

Exe:Late[st] was released on Steam for Microsoft Windows systems on August 20, 2018. Exe:Late[st] is then re-titled to the update below, Exe:Late[cl-r], for those who owned PlayStation 4 and Windows versions. This also occurs for Steam giving the illusion that [cl-r] was released in 2018.

A final revision of the game, entitled , was released for PlayStation 4 and Switch. It was announced at EVO 2019 for February 20, 2020 release, while Europe released the game on the next day, after it was released in Japan and North America. The PlayStation 4 version has an update for those who owned the version of Exe:Late[st], while the players who purchased the PlayStation 3 version can get a limited discount until April 30, 2020, in Japan and North America, and April 31, 2020, on Europe. Any players who owned Exe:Late[st] to update, contents which were added to Exe:Late[cl-r] update remains paid DLCs. A Microsoft Windows port was released on March 27, 2020. The arcade port of Exe:Late [cl-r] was released on April 15, 2021. The game was also released for Amazon Luna on January 21, 2021.

Reception

The PlayStation 3 version of the game received a 29/40 by Famitsu. Destructoid said that it was "an intelligent, tactical fighting game that I'll surely be playing for a long time to come." IGN said it was "One good fighting game. Maybe it's not as deep as previous Arc System Works games, but successfully achieves what it is aiming: to let the player enjoy it." Eurogamer concluded "an interesting 2d fighting game with a very unique fighting system. Just try it, and you'll be amazed." It was nominated for the category of Best Fighting at The Game Awards 2020, but lost to Mortal Kombat 11.

Future
On September 21, 2021, director Nobuya Narita and composer Raito confirmed on Twitter that the "next" installment of Under Night In-Birth was in development. Narita expressed interest in the announcement of said title coinciding with the tenth anniversary of the original release of the game. It was not explicitly stated whether this referred to a new version of Under Night In-Birth or a wholly new title set within the same universe.

See also
Skullgirls
Melty Blood series
Akatsuki Blitzkampf series
Dengeki Bunko: Fighting Climax
BlazBlue: Cross Tag Battle

References

External links
Under Night In-Birth
 
Under Night In-Birth Exe:Late
 
 (in Europe)

Under Night In-Birth Exe:Late[st]
 
 (in U.S.A.)
 (in Europe)
Under Night In-Birth Exe:Late[cl-r]
 

2012 video games
2D fighting games
ALL.Net games
Arc System Works games
Arcade video games
Fighting games used at the Evolution Championship Series tournament
Fighting games used at the Super Battle Opera tournament
Fighting games
French-Bread games
Multiplayer and single-player video games
Nintendo Switch games
PlayStation 3 games
PlayStation 4 games
PlayStation Vita games
PQube games
Sega video games
Video games developed in Japan
Video games with alternative versions
Visual novels
Windows games